Yesterday, Today and Forever is an album by saxophonist/flautist Bud Shank and flugelhornist/trumpeter Shorty Rogers recorded in 1983 and released on the Concord Jazz label.

Reception

Scott Yanow, writing for AllMusic, commented: "Rogers is in pretty good form on the quintet date although occasionally overshadowed by altoist Bud Shank (who doubles on flute). The rhythm section is excellent, the repertoire is full of vehicles for swinging improvisations and the musicians sound fairly inspired. Recommended".

Track listing
All compositions by Shorty Rogers, except where indicated.
 "Budo" (Bud Powell, Miles Davis) - 5:09 	
 "Blood Count" (Billy Strayhorn) - 6:27
 "Yesterday, Today and Forever" - 7:29
 "TNT" (Tiny Kahn) - 4:14
 "Wagon Wheels" (Peter DeRose, Billy Hill) - 8:08 	
 "Lotus Bud" - 5:21
 "Have You Hugged a Martian Today" - 6:47

Personnel
Shorty Rogers - fluegelhorn, trumpet
Bud Shank - alto saxophone, flute
George Cables - piano
Bob Magnusson - bass
Roy McCurdy - drums

References

1983 albums
Concord Records albums
Bud Shank albums
Shorty Rogers albums